Jahnstadion Regensburg is a football stadium in Regensburg, Germany. It is the home of Jahn Regensburg, replacing the old Jahnstadion.

References

External links 

  

SSV Jahn Regensburg
Football venues in Germany
Sport in Regensburg
Buildings and structures in Regensburg
Sports venues in Bavaria